The 2018 MTV EMAs (also known as the MTV Europe Music Awards) was held at the Bizkaia Arena (Bilbao Exhibition Centre) in Barakaldo, part of  Greater Bilbao, Basque Country, Spain, on 4 November 2018. The ceremony's host was Hailee Steinfeld. This was the third time that Spain hosted the ceremony.

Camila Cabello was nominated for 6 awards, followed by Ariana Grande and Post Malone, who were each nominated for five. Cabello won four awards, becoming the most awarded artist of the night.

In association with the EMAs, an event called MTV Music Week was organised, which run from 29 October to 3 November at different locations throughout the province of Biscay. The main concert, part of the MTV World Stage series, was held at San Mamés Stadium on 3 November, headlined by Muse and Crystal Fighters.

Nominations

Winners are in bold text.

Regional nominations
Winners are in bold text.

Performances

Pre show

Main show

Appearances
 Michael Peña and Diego Luna — presented Best Artist
 Dua Lipa — introduced Rosalía
 Debby Ryan — presented Best Song
 Lindsay Lohan — presented Best Electronic
 Terry Crews — introduced Muse
 Ashlee Simpson and Evan Ross — presented Best Pop
 Jourdan Dunn and Terry Crews — presented Best Video
 Anitta and Sofía Reyes — presented Best Hip-Hop
 Camila Cabello and Jason Derulo — presented Global Icon

See also
2018 MTV Video Music Awards

References

External links
Official website 

mtv
2018
2018 in the Basque Country (autonomous community)